I Thank a Fool is a 1962 British Metrocolor crime film made by Eaton (De Grunwald Productions) and Metro-Goldwyn-Mayer in CinemaScope. It was directed by Robert Stevens and produced by Anatole de Grunwald from a screenplay by Karl Tunberg based on the 1958 novel of the same title by Audrey Erskine Lindop. The music score was by Ron Goodwin and the cinematography by Harry Waxman.

The film stars Susan Hayward and Peter Finch with Diane Cilento and Cyril Cusack. Also in the cast are Kieron Moore, Richard Wattis, Athene Seyler, Miriam Karlin, Laurence Naismith, J. G. Devlin, Clive Morton, Richard Leech and Brenda De Banzie.

Plot 

Dr. Christine Allison (Susan Hayward) is convicted of manslaughter for the mercy killing of her terminally ill, married lover. After serving two years in prison, she is unable to find work.

Help comes from a surprising source—she is approached by Stephen Dane (Peter Finch), the man who prosecuted her, to look after his disturbed wife Liane (Diane Cilento). Suspicious, she presses him for the reason he wants her. His need is a trained doctor, but not one who has the power to commit Liane to a mental asylum. Since Christine's medical license has been taken away, she is perfect. Desperate, she accepts the job.

Christine's misgivings about Stephen's motives increase as time goes by. The final straw comes when Liane's father, Captain Ferris (Cyril Cusack), unexpectedly appears while the Danes are out. Christine had been told that his death in a car accident had unhinged Liane. He leaves without seeing his daughter, despite Christine's pleas.

Christine tells Liane the truth and persuades her to go back to her childhood home in Ireland to see her father. They find him there, drunk and living with a woman. A disillusioned Liane has another breakdown. When Stephen shows up, she falls while running away. The injury is not serious, and the doctor gives Christine a bottle of pills. As instructed, she gives Liane two to help her sleep.

The next morning, Liane is found dead and the bottle is missing. At the inquest, the coroner (J.G. Devlin) uncovers Christine's past. In her defense, she accuses Stephen of hiring her to draw suspicion away from him.

During a recess, she notices Ferris looking at his heirloom pocket watch, though Liane had stolen it and had it with her the night before her death. He admits Liane took the overdose herself. He found her dead and took the bottle away. In the past, he had been prosecuted by Stephen and had tried to bribe him by sending his then seventeen-year-old daughter to Stephen's hotel room. When the charges were dropped (though Stephen claims it was for other reasons), Ferris began blackmailing him. Stephen finally balked at paying more money, so Ferris took the opportunity to get back at him.

As the police try to take him into custody, Ferris leans against a rotted fence and falls to his death. Stephen asks Christine for a lift and they drive away together.

Cast
 Susan Hayward as Christine Allison
 Peter Finch as Stephen Dane
 Diane Cilento as Liane Dane
 Cyril Cusack as Captain Ferris
 Kieron Moore as Roscoe
 Richard Wattis as Ebblington
 Athene Seyler as Aunt Heather
 Miriam Karlin as Woman in the Black Maria
 Laurence Naismith as O'Grady
 J.G. Devlin as Coroner
 Clive Morton as Judge
 Richard Leech as Irish Doctor
 Brenda de Banzie as Nurse Drew
 Edwin Apps as Junior Counsel
 Grace Arnold as 2nd Wardress
 Peter Sallis as Prospective Employer (uncredited)
 Peter Vaughan as Police Inspector (uncredited)
 Joan Hickson as Landlady (uncredited)
 Joan Benham as Restaurant Manageress (uncredited)

Production
The film was based on a novel. Sol C. Siegel bought the film rights in March 1957, prior to publication, as a vehicle for Inger Stevens who the producer had under personal contract. The author was going to write the script. In June 1957 Peter Glenville signed to direct. By August the lead role was given to Ingrid Bergman with filming to take place in England and Ireland. Siegel set up the film at MGM where the producer was making a slate of movies including Home from the Hill, Some Came Running, Bachelor in Paradise, and The End of the World.

In January 1958 MGM announced the movie would be made in England that year. The same month John Patrick was reported as working on the script. However in March Grenville dropped out due to competing commitments. Filming kept  being delayed. In July 1960 MGM announced the film's stars would be Susan Hayward and Stewart Granger. Eventually Granger dropped out and was replaced by Peter Finch. The job of directing was given to Robert Stevens who had never made a film before but had a strong reputation as a television director. Finch called him "the most exciting director I've ever worked with."

Reception

Box Office
According to MGM accounts the film lost $1,207,000.

References

External links 

 
 
 
 

1962 films
1960s crime films
British crime films
British mystery films
1960s English-language films
Films based on British novels
Films directed by Robert Stevens
Films produced by Anatole de Grunwald
Films scored by Ron Goodwin
Films shot in Merseyside
Films shot in the Republic of Ireland
Films about mental health
Metro-Goldwyn-Mayer films
CinemaScope films
Films shot at MGM-British Studios
1960s British films